The 1987 Monza 500 was the first round of the inaugural World Touring Car Championship. The race was held for cars eligible for Group A touring car regulations. It was held on March 22, 1987, at the Autodromo Nazionale di Monza, in Monza, Italy.

The race was won by Australian drivers Allan Moffat and John Harvey, driving a V8 powered Holden VL Commodore SS Group A, after the  BMW M3s of Schnitzer Motorsport, CiBiEmme Sport and Bigazzi (all running under the BMW Motorsport banner) which had finished in the top six positions on the road were disqualified for being approximately  underweight through the use of kevlar body panels. The M3s had initially passed through post race scrutineering, but a privateer BMW team protested when their M3, which had been built by BMW Motorsport, was found to be 50 kg heavier than the works cars.

The leading car eligible for championship points was the Alfa Romeo 75 of Walter Voulaz and Marcello Cipriani which finished 7th outright, some 7 laps behind Moffat and Harvey.

The expected challenge from the Eggenberger Motorsport team and their brand new Ford Sierra RS Cosworth turbo's failed to materialise. The Texaco sponsored, Swiss built Ford's failed to pass scrutineering when they appeared with a non-homologated engine management system. As there was no way to change the system at that late stage, Ruedi Eggenberger withdrew his cars from the event. The new Sierra turbo's did show speed though with British driver Andy Rouse claiming pole position for the race in his RS Cosworth.

Class structure
Cars were divided into three classes based on engine capacity:
 Division 1: 1-1600cc
 Division 2: 1601-2500cc
 Division 3: Over 2500cc

Official results
Results were as follows:
| Entered: 41
| Started: 38
| Finished: 17

See also
 1987 World Touring Car Championship

References

Monza 500
Monza 500